Tagulis is a genus of crab spiders in the family Thomisidae, containing only two species.

Species
 Tagulis granulosus Simon, 1895 — Sierra Leone
 Tagulis mystacinus Simon, 1895 — Sri Lanka

References

Thomisidae
Araneomorphae genera
Spiders of Asia
Spiders of Africa